Scott Belsky (born April 18, 1980) is an American entrepreneur, author and early-stage investor best known for co-creating the online portfolio platform, Behance, Inc. In 2010, Belsky was included in Fast Company's "100 Most Creative People in Business" list.

In December 2012, Behance was acquired by Adobe where Belsky became VP of Products, Mobile and Community at Adobe. In February 2016 Belsky left Adobe and joined Benchmark as the firm's sixth general partner. Prior to joining Benchmark, Belsky had been an early-stage investor and active advisor to companies including Uber, Warby Parker, Pinterest, Periscope and Sweetgreen. In 2017, Belsky returned to Adobe as the Chief Product Officer, Executive Vice President for Adobe Creative Cloud.

Personal life and education
Belsky graduated from Cornell University. He received his MBA from Harvard Business School. Belsky serves on the advisory board of Cornell University's Entrepreneurship Program, and is a board member for the Cooper-Hewitt Smithsonian National Design Museum.  Belsky is the grandson of Stanley Kaplan.

Books
 Making Ideas Happen, Penguin Group, 2010 
 The Messy Middle: Finding Your Way Through the Hardest and Most Crucial Part of Any Bold Venture, Penguin Group, 2018 

Belsky also has a chapter giving advice in Tim Ferriss' book Tools of Titans.

References

External links
 

1980 births
Living people
Adobe Inc. people
American company founders
American businesspeople in the online media industry
American male writers
Cornell University alumni
Harvard Business School alumni